Shcherba, Ščerba, Scherbo, or Szczerba is a Slavic-language surname. It has the same form for both genders in most languages, except Czech and Slovak. The word means "gap", "dent", or "nick" in some languages such as Polish. In Ukraine, it is also a term for certain kinds of soup. Related surnames include Shcherbak, Shcherbakov, and Shcherban.

People
  (1917–2000), Czechoslovak pilot in World War II
 Denisa Ščerbová (born 1986), Czech athlete
 Vitaly Scherbo (born 1972), Belarusian gymnast
 Hanna Shcherba, (born 1982), Belarusian-French swimmer
 Lev Shcherba (1880–1944), Belarusian-Russian linguist
 Mariya Shcherba (born 1985), Belarusian swimmer
 Uladzimir Shcherba (born 1986), Belarusian footballer
 Andrew Szczerba (born 1988), American football tight end
 Kazimierz Szczerba (born 1954), Polish amateur boxer
 Michał Szczerba (born 1977) Polish politician

See also

References

Belarusian-language surnames
Ukrainian-language surnames